Fred Francis Marsh (January 5, 1924 – October 26, 2006) was an American infielder in Major League Baseball who played in  and from  to  for the Cleveland Indians, St. Louis Browns, Washington Senators, Chicago White Sox and Baltimore Orioles, primarily as a third baseman.

Born in Valley Falls, Kansas, Marsh was signed originally by the Chicago Cubs in  after graduating from Chicago's Steinmetz High School in 1941. Marsh joined the Navy during World War II and was discharged in 1945.

Baseball career
Marsh made his big league debut on April 19, 1949, at the age of 25 for the Indians, who acquired him from the Cubs' system before the 1947 season. He appeared in only one game that year, as a pinch runner.

He did not play in the major leagues in 1950. In , on April 1, he was traded to the St. Louis Browns with $35,000 for infielders Snuffy Stirnweiss and Merl Combs. He played in 130 games for St. Louis, hitting .243 with four home runs, 21 doubles and 43 RBI in 445 at bats during the only season in which he would in 100 or more games.

Marsh experienced an unusual  campaign. He started the year with the Browns, but on May 12 was traded with Lou Sleater to the Washington Senators for Cass Michaels. Less than one month later, the Senators traded him back to the Browns for Earl Rapp. Marsh had started off poorly as a Brown, hitting only .208 in his first 11 games, thus prompting his trade to the Senators. He fared even worse with Washington, though, appearing in nine games and collecting only one hit in 24 at bats. His second turn with the Browns that year proved to be much more successful – in 76 games, he hit .287 with two home runs and 26 RBI. Overall that year, he hit .258 with two home runs, 28 RBI and 29 runs scored.

On January 20, he was traded to the White Sox for Dixie Upright and $25,000. His first year with the White Sox produced only a .200 average in 95 at bats over 67 games. After the season, he was traded with Matt Batts, Don Ferrarese, and Don Johnson to the Baltimore Orioles for Jim Brideweser, Bob Chakales, and Clint Courtney on December 6. The trade reunited Marsh with manager Paul Richards, his skipper in Chicago during the previous two seasons.

In , Marsh played in 89 games for Baltimore, collecting 66 hits in 303 at-bats for a .218 average, although he drew 35 bases on balls. He missed nearly half of the season with a broken elbow and a leg injury. The  campaign would be his last in the big leagues.  Marsh collected only three hits in 24 at bats through May 29. 

Overall, Marsh hit .239 in 465 games in his career. He collected 296 hits in 1,236 at bats, including 43 doubles, eight triples and ten home runs. He scored 146 runs and drove in 96. He had a stellar stolen base percentage, as he was only caught once in 14 attempts – a 92.9% success rate. He had a good eye at the plate as well, walking 125 times and striking out 171 times. He had a .948 career fielding percentage. Statistically, the player he is most similar to is Ken Hamlin.

After his baseball career, he spent many years as a postal carrier.

After his death in Corry, Pennsylvania at the age of 82, he was buried at Pine Grove Cemetery in Corry.

References

External links

BaseballLibrary

1924 births
2006 deaths
Baltimore Orioles players
Baseball players from Chicago
Chicago White Sox players
Cleveland Indians players
Elizabethton Betsy Red Sox players
Major League Baseball third basemen
People from Valley Falls, Kansas
St. Louis Browns players
United States Navy personnel of World War II
United States Navy sailors
Washington Senators (1901–1960) players